The United Kingdom competed under the team name of Great Britain and Northern Ireland at the 2018 European Athletics Championships in Berlin, Germany, from 6-12 August 2018. British Athletics named a team of 102 athletes on 24 July 2018, the largest British team sent to an athletics competition since the 1908 Olympic Games. Alyson Dixon was selected for the marathon, but withdrew due to injury. Dai Greene was voted to be the captain of the team, but he withdrew from competition due to injury on the first day of championships.

Medals

Results

Men

Track & road events

Field Events

Combined events – Decathlon

Women

Track & road events

Field Events

Combined events – Heptathlon

Key
Q = Qualified for the next round
q = Qualified for the next round as a fastest loser or, in field events, by position without achieving the qualifying target
N/A = Round not applicable for the event
Bye = Athlete not required to compete in round

See also
Great Britain and Northern Ireland at the 2018 European Championships

References

Nations at the 2018 European Athletics Championships
Great Britain at the European Athletics Championships
European Athletics Championships